Major-General Edward Charles Colville  (1 September 1905 – 10 January 1982) was a senior British Army officer.

Military career
Born the son of Admiral Sir Stanley Colville and Adelaide Jane Meade, Colville was commissioned into the Gordon Highlanders on 3 September 1925. He became commanding officer of the 2nd Battalion, the Gordon Highlanders in August 1943 and commander of 227th Infantry Brigade in North West Europe in July 1944 during the Second World War. He commanded the brigade during Operation Plunder, the crossing of the Rhine, opposite Xanten in March 1945.

After the war he became Defence adviser in Canada in December 1946, commander of the 128th Infantry Brigade in November 1949 and Assistant Chief of Staff (Operations) at British Army of the Rhine in June 1952. He went on to be Chief of Staff at Headquarters Far East Land Forces in June 1954 and General Officer Commanding 51st (Highland) Division in March 1956 before retiring in March 1959.

In retirement he served as a deputy lieutenant of West Sussex.

Family
In 1934 he married Barbara Joan Denny; they had two daughters.

References

Bibliography

External links
British Army Officers 1939–1945
Generals of World War II

1905 births
1982 deaths
British Army major generals
Gordon Highlanders officers
Edward
Companions of the Order of the Bath
Companions of the Distinguished Service Order
British Army brigadiers of World War II
People educated at Marlborough College
Graduates of the Royal Military College, Sandhurst
Graduates of the Staff College, Camberley
People from London
Deputy Lieutenants of West Sussex
English justices of the peace
Military personnel from London